Marcom or MARCOM may refer to:

 United States Maritime Commission was an agency of the U.S. federal government that replaced the United States Shipping Board in 1936, and was abolished in 1950.
 Marketing communications
 Canadian Forces Maritime Command, the name used by the Royal Canadian Navy from 1968 to 2011
 Maritime Community, a programme of the European Union which includes the Mediterranean Science Commission
 NATO Allied Maritime Command

People with the surname
 Micheline Aharonian Marcom (born 1968), American writer